Eupithecia cestata  is a moth in the family Geometridae first described by George Duryea Hulst in 1896. It is found in the US state of California.

The forewings are light whitish gray, but this color only appears in areas at the basal third of the wing and subterminally in the costal half. The balance of the wing is rather heavily suffused with purplish brown, which is especially strong in the outer half above the inner margin. Adults have been recorded on wing from March to June.

References

cestata
Endemic fauna of California
Moths of North America
Moths described in 1896
Fauna without expected TNC conservation status